Wi Kuki Kaa (16 December 1938 – 19 February 2006) was a New Zealand actor in film, theatre and television. He was from the Māori iwi of Ngati Porou and Ngati Kahungunu.

Family
Kaa was born in Rangitukia on New Zealand's East Cape. His father was the Reverend Tipi Whenua Kaa, from Rangitukia, who was vicar of the Waiapu parish and his mother Hohipene Kaa (formerly Whaanga) was from Wairoa. He was one of 12 children: his siblings include the writer and te reo advocate Keri Kaa, Hone Kaa, an Anglican church leader, child welfare advocate, and Arapera Blank, a writer and poet.

Career
Kaa featured in many films, including the lead role of 'Iwi' in Ngati (1987), written by Tama Poata and directed by Barry Barclay. Kaa won the "Best Film Performance, Male" at the 1988 New Zealand Film and TV Awards for this role, and in 1987 alongside Barclay, Poata and producer John O'Shea attended a screening at Cannes Film Festival in the Critics Week programme. He also played a lead role in the film Utu (1983) directed by Geoff Murphy. Kaa featured in the music video Little Things by Wellington roots dub band Trinity Roots. In 2006, Kaa died in Wellington aged 67.

Filmography

Film
Inn of the Damned (1975) - Tom
Utu (1983) - Wiremu
The Bounty (1984) - King Tynah
Kingpin (1985) - Mr Nathan
Ngati (1987) - Iwi
Linda's Body (1990, Short) - Hemi
Te Rau (1991) - Rewi Marangai
Turangawaewae (2002) - Tiare (Koro)
River Queen (2005) - Old Rangi

Television
Homicide (1971) - Rollo
Spyforce (1973) - Matthas / Hiromoto / Nikolu Yaratomo / Colonel Mayusaki / Sergeant Shikoya
Silent Number (1974) - Tony
Worzel Gummidge Down Under (1986–1987) - Travelling Scarecrow Maker
The Diamond of Jeru (2001, TV Movie) - Inghai
The Strip (2002) - Bible Bill
Der Liebe entgegen (2002, TV Movie) - Henry Tufare

References

External links

New Zealand male stage actors
New Zealand male film actors
New Zealand male television actors
1938 births
2006 deaths
New Zealand male Māori actors
Ngāti Porou people
Ngāti Kahungunu people